The 1912 United States presidential election in Oregon took place on November 5, 1912, as part of the 1912 United States presidential election. State voters chose five representatives, or electors, to the Electoral College, who voted for president and vice president.

Oregon was won by Princeton University President Woodrow Wilson (D–Virginia), running with governor of Indiana Thomas R. Marshall, with 34.34% of the popular vote, against the 26th president of the United States Theodore Roosevelt (P–New York), running with California Governor Hiram Johnson, with 27.44% of the popular vote, the 27th president of the United States William Howard Taft (R–Ohio), running with Columbia University President Nicholas Murray Butler, with 25.30% of the popular vote and the five-time candidate of the Socialist Party of America for President of the United States Eugene V. Debs (S–Indiana), running with the first Socialist mayor of a major city in the United States Emil Seidel, with 9.74% of the popular vote. 

As a result of his win, Wilson became the first Democratic presidential candidate since Horatio Seymour in 1868 to win Oregon.

, this is the only election where Oregon voted Democratic while neighboring Washington didn't.

Results

Results by county

See also
 United States presidential elections in Oregon

Notes

References

Oregon
1912
1912 Oregon elections